Beveridge is a closed railway station on the North East railway that served the township of Beveridge, Victoria, Australia.

This station opened on 14 October 1872. A goods shed was provided on opening, until moved in 1885 to the down side of the line. The final station building was located on the down platform and was imported from Bright to replace the original in October 1900.

The platform of the station was extended in 1883, with duplication of the line from Donnybrook and construction of the Melbourne bound platform carried out the same year. Duplication continued northwards in 1886. The station was closed on 2 April 1990 and the platforms were removed on 14 February 1991. Today the platform mounds can still be seen, as well as the slewing of the parallel standard gauge line away from the former up platform, and the widening of the railway reserve.

References

Disused railway stations in Victoria (Australia)